= Mohammad Nagar (Sattikheda) =

Village in Madhya Pradesh, India

Imaliya is a village in the Bhopal district of Madhya Pradesh, India. It is located in the Huzur tehsil and the Phanda block.

== Demographics ==
According to the 2011 census of India, Mohammad Nagar has 16 households. The effective literacy rate (i.e. the literacy rate of population excluding children aged 6 and below) is 59.74%.

Demographics (2011 Census)
	Total	Male	Female
Population	101	49	52
Children aged below 6 years	24	9	15
Scheduled caste	41	19	22
Scheduled tribe	0	0	0
Literates	46	24	22
Workers (all)	52	27	25
Main workers (total)	29	18	11
Main workers: Cultivators	20	12	8
Main workers: Agricultural labourers	9	6	3
Main workers: Household industry workers	0	0	0
Main workers: Other	0	0	0
Marginal workers (total)	23	9	14
Marginal workers: Cultivators	5	1	4
Marginal workers: Agricultural labourers	15	6	9
Marginal workers: Household industry workers	0	0	0
Marginal workers: Others	3	2	1
Non-workers	49	22	27
